The Kuril Flyover is the third largest  flyover in Bangladesh. Its foundation stone was laid on 2 May 2010.  
Finally the work started in March 2011.

The flyover was opened on 4 August 2013.

References

Transport in Bangladesh